Qandala District, also spelled Candala District is a district in the northeastern Bari region of Somalia. Its capital lies at Qandala (Candala).

References

External links
 Districts of Somalia
 Administrative map of Qandala District

Districts of Somalia

Bari, Somalia